McKinnon (MacKinnon, Mackinnon) is a surname.

McKinnon may also refer to:

Places

Australia
 McKinnon, Victoria in Australia, suburb of Melbourne
 McKinnon Secondary College, a State Secondary College
 McKinnon railway station, on the Frankston railway line

United States
  McKinnon, Georgia in Wayne County, Georgia
  McKinnon Township, listed in List of townships in North Dakota by county
 McKinnon, Tennessee in Houston County
 McKinnon, Wyoming in Sweetwater County

Other countries
 McKinnon Park Secondary School, high school in Caledonia, Ontario
 Mackinnon Road, Kenyan town
 McKinnon's, a settlement in the Major Division of North Coast, Saint John Parish, Antigua and Barbuda

Other uses
 McKinnon Broadcasting, privately owned broadcasting company based in San Diego, California
 Clan Mackinnon, a Highland Scottish clan associated with the islands of Mull and Skye

See also